Because I Can may refer to:

 Because I Can (Katy Rose album)
 Because I Can (Mice album)
 A phrase uttered by people who have absolutely no logical reason for doing something when asked why they were doing that thing in the first place; A valid verbal justification of any action that is without clear goal or purpose